Language Arts is an album by Canadian alternative hip hop musician Buck 65, released in 1996 on the Four Ways To Rock/Metaphorensics labels (see 1996 in music) and reissued by Warner in 2002.

The album is considered the first in the (presently) seven-part Language Arts series, also taking in the Vertex, Man Overboard, Synesthesia, Square, and Talkin' Honky Blues albums, as well as 2006's Strong Arm mixtape made available online.

The record saw several pressings with different artwork. The original was released only on cassette with artwork by Thesis; later CD versions were designed by Hugh Morse with artwork by Nick Recka. Additionally, this record and the other two Language Arts records prior to Buck's signing to Warner Music were remastered, repackaged with new artwork, and re-released by Warner in 2002. There is also a two disc versions of this album that is close to 90 minutes long.

Voices
Like most Buck 65 albums, this album contains various sounds of people talking.

 "Totem Pole" begins with a short rap excerpt.
 "Loose Teeth" has a phone conversation on a man's first time being stoned.
 The ending of "Obstacle Course" and the beginning of "Beauty is a Skill" has a man repeating "Buck 65" over and over.
 A man talks about Buck 65 at the beginning of "Diesel Treatment".

Track listing
"Totem Pole" – 5:13
"Pubic's Tube" – 3:12 
"Loose Teeth" – 3:30
"Frame and Fork" – 3:01
"Grindstone Cowboy" – 3:20
"Wax Lips" – 1:12
"Eye Make-up Excuses" – 3:05
"Seventeen" – 2:42
"Gauze" – 1:49
"Bush Pilot" – 3:02
"Obstacle Course" – 2:05
"Beauty is a Skill" – 3:25
"'86 Jetta" – 3:17
"G.C. Luther" – 2:54
"Sick Stew" – 2:38
"Diesel Treatment" – 23:58

References

Buck 65 albums
1996 albums
Warner Records albums